Class M10 is a mainline diesel-electric locomotive built by Banaras Locomotive Works, India, which is the largest diesel-electric locomotive manufacturer in India, for Sri Lanka Railways and constructed in 2012. M10 is similar in appearance to DLW WDM3D but specifications are somewhat different. This is one of the longest locomotive types in Sri Lanka. These Locomotives are for the Sri Lanka Railways as part of the ongoing Northern Railway reconstruction project.

History
Class M10 locomotives were introduced in 2012 numbered 915, 916, 917. These were used mainly on freight and oil trains. They have also been used irregularly on passenger services. M10 locomotives were also used for ballast trains in the construction work of the rail lines to Talaimannar and Kankesanthurai.

Class M10A
Another 6 locomotives were imported in 2012 were named under M10A class numbered 941 on wards. This is a technical variant of original M10 locomotive.
On 20 September 2013, an M10A locomotive was successfully sent on trial to Kandy, the first time they were sent on the up country line.

Usage
This class was used for construction work at the Talaimannar and Kankesanthurai lines. After extending the northern line to Jaffna and beyond, M10s were used for passenger services including Yal Devi on the northern line.

See also

Diesel locomotives of Sri Lanka

References

M10
5 ft 6 in gauge locomotives
Railway locomotives introduced in 2012